The 2018 Johnsonville 180 was a NASCAR Xfinity Series race held on August 25, 2018 at Road America in Elkhart Lake, Wisconsin. Contested over 45 laps on the  road course, it was the 23rd race of the 2018 NASCAR Xfinity Series season.

Entry list

Practice

First practice
Conor Daly was the only other driver to go out, but he did not complete a full timed lap. Most drivers did not participate due to persistent light rain throughout first practice.

Final practice

Qualifying

Qualifying results

Race

Stage Results

Stage 1

Stage 2

Final Stage Results

Stage 3

References

Johnsonville 180
Johnsonville 180
NASCAR races at Road America
2018 NASCAR Xfinity Series